The Old Yue language is an unknown unclassified language (or many different languages).  It can refer to Yue, which was spoken in the realm of Yue during the Spring and Autumn period. It can also refer to the variety of different languages spoken by the Baiyue.  Possible languages spoken by them may have been of Kra–Dai, Hmong–Mien, Austronesian, Austroasiatic and other origins.

Knowledge of Yue speech is limited to fragmentary references and possible loanwords in other languages, principally Chinese. The longest attestation is the Song of the Yue Boatman, a short song transcribed phonetically in Chinese characters in 528 BC and included, with a Chinese version, in the Garden of Stories compiled by Liu Xiang five centuries later.

Native Nanyue people likely spoke Old Yue, while Han settlers and government officials spoke Old Chinese. Some suggest that the descendants of the Nanyue spoke Austroasiatic languages. Others suggest a language related to the modern Zhuang people. It is plausible to say that the Yue spoke more than one language. Old Chinese in the region was likely much influenced by Yue speech (and vice versa), and many Old Yue loanwords in Chinese have been identified by modern scholars.

Classification theories
There is some disagreement about the languages the Yue spoke, with candidates drawn from the non-Sinitic language families still represented in areas of southern China, pre-Kra–Dai, pre-Hmong–Mien, pre-Austronesian, and pre-Austroasiatic; as Chinese, Kra–Dai, Hmong–Mien, Austronesian, and the Vietic branch of Austroasiatic have similar tone systems, syllable structure, grammatical features and lack of inflection, but these features are believed to have spread by means of diffusion across the Mainland Southeast Asia linguistic area, rather than indicating common descent.
Scholars in China often assume that the Yue spoke an early form of Kra–Dai. According to Sagart (2008), this is far from self-evident, because the core of the Kra–Dai area geographically is located in Hainan and the China-Vietnam border region, which is beyond the extreme southern end of the Yue area. The linguist Wei Qingwen gave a rendering of the "Song of the Yue boatman" in Standard Zhuang. Zhengzhang Shangfang proposed an interpretation of the song in written Thai (dating from the late 13th century) as the closest available approximation to the original language, but his interpretation remains controversial. 
Peiros (2011) shows with his analysis that the homeland of Austroasiatic is somewhere near the Yangtze. He suggests southern Sichuan or slightly west from it, as the likely homeland of proto-Austroasiatic speakers before they migrated to other parts of China and then into Southeast Asia. He further suggests that the family must be as old as proto-Austronesian and proto-Sino-Tibetan or even older. The linguists Sagart (2011) and Bellwood (2013) support the theory of an origin of Austroasiatic along the Yangtze river in southern China.
Sagart (2008) suggests that the Old Yue language, together with the proto-Austronesian language, was descended from the language or languages of the Tánshíshān‑Xītóu culture complex (modern day Fujian province of China), making the Old Yue language a sister language to proto-Austronesian, which Sagart sees as the origin of the Kra–Dai languages.

Behr (2009) also notes that the Chǔ dialect of Old Chinese was influenced by several substrata, predominantly Kra-Dai, but also possibly Austroasiatic, Austronesian and Hmong-Mien.

Kra–Dai arguments
The proto-Kra–Dai language has been hypothesized to originate in the Lower Yangtze valleys. Ancient Chinese texts refer to non-Sinitic languages spoken across this substantial region and their speakers as "Yue". Although those languages are extinct, traces of their existence could be found in unearthed inscriptional materials, ancient Chinese historical texts and non-Han substrata in various Southern Chinese dialects. Thai, one of the Tai languages and the most-spoken language in the Kra–Dai language family, has been used extensively in historical-comparative linguistics to identify the origins of language(s) spoken in the ancient region of South China. One of the very few direct records of non-Sinitic speech in pre-Qin and Han times having been preserved so far is the "Song of the Yue Boatman" (Yueren Ge 越人歌), which was transcribed phonetically in Chinese characters in 528 BC, and found in the 善说 Shanshuo chapter of the Shuoyuan 说苑 or 'Garden of Persuasions'.

Willeam Meacham (1996) reports that Chinese linguists have shown strong evidence of Tai vestiges in former Yue areas: Lin (1990) found Tai elements in some Min dialects, Zhenzhang (1990) has proposed Tai etymologies and interpretations for certain place names in the former states of Wu and Yue, and Wei (1982) found similarities in the words, combinations and rhyming scheme between the "Song of the Yue Boatman" and the Kam–Tai languages.

James R. Chamberlain (2016) proposes that the Kra-Dai language family was formed as early as the 12th century BCE in the middle of the Yangtze basin, coinciding roughly with the establishment of the Chu state and the beginning of the Zhou dynasty. Following the southward migrations of Kra and Hlai (Rei/Li) peoples around the 8th century BCE, the Yue (Be-Tai people) started to break away and move to the east coast in the present-day Zhejiang province, in the 6th century BCE, forming the state of Yue and conquering the state of Wu shortly thereafter. According to Chamberlain, Yue people (Be-Tai) began to migrate southwards along the east coast of China to what are now Guangxi, Guizhou and northern Vietnam, after Yue was conquered by Chu around 333 BCE. There the Yue (Be-Tai) formed the polities Xi Ou, which became the Northern Tai and the Luo Yue, which became the Central-Southwestern Tai. However, Pittayaporn (2014), after examining layers of Chinese loanwords in proto-Southwestern Tai and other historical evidence, proposes that the southwestward migration of southwestern Tai-speaking tribes from the modern Guangxi to the mainland of Southeast Asia must have taken place only sometime between the 8th–10th centuries CE, long after 44 CE, when Chinese sources last mentioned Luo Yue in the Red River Delta.

Ancient textual evidence
In the early 1980s, Zhuang linguist, Wei Qingwen (韦庆稳), electrified the scholarly community in Guangxi by identifying the language in the "Song of the Yue Boatman" as a language ancestral to Zhuang. Wei used reconstructed Old Chinese for the characters and discovered that the resulting vocabulary showed strong resemblance to modern Zhuang. Later, Zhengzhang Shangfang (1991) followed Wei’s insight but used Thai script for comparison, since this orthography dates from the 13th century and preserves archaisms relative to the modern pronunciation. Zhengzhang notes that 'evening, night, dark' bears the C tone in Wuming Zhuang xamC2 and ɣamC2 'night'. The item raa normally means 'we inclusive' but in some places, e.g. Tai Lue and White Tai 'I'. However, Laurent criticizes Zhengzhang's interpretation as anachronistic, because however archaic that Thai script is, Thai language was only written 2000 years after the song had been recorded; even if the Proto-Kam-Tai might have emerged by 6th century BCE, its pronunciation would have been substantially different from Thai. The following is a simplified interpretation of the "Song of the Yue Boatman" by Zhengzhang Shangfang quoted by David Holm (2013) with Thai script and Chinese glosses being omitted:

Some scattered non-Sinitic words found in the two ancient Chinese fictional texts, the Mu Tianzi Zhuan (4th c. B.C.) and the Yuejue shu (1st c. A.D.), can be compared to lexical items in Kra-Dai languages. These two texts are only preserved in corrupt versions and share a rather convoluted editorial history. Wolfgang Behr (2002) makes an attempt to identify the origins of those words:

"吳謂善「伊」, 謂稻道「緩」, 號從中國, 名從主人。"

“The Wú say yī for ‘good’ and huăn for ‘way’, i.e. in their titles they follow the central kingdoms, but in their names they follow their own lords.”

伊 yī < ʔjij < *bq(l)ij ← Siamese diiA1, Longzhou dai1, Bo'ai nii1 Daiya li1, Sipsongpanna di1, Dehong li6 < proto-Tai *ʔdɛiA1 | Sui ʔdaai1, Kam laai1, Maonan ʔdaai1, Mak ʔdaai6 < proto-Kam-Sui/proto-Kam-Tai *ʔdaai1 'good'

緩 [huăn] < hwanX < *awan ← Siamese honA1, Bo'ai hɔn1, Dioi thon1 < proto-Tai *xronA1| Sui khwən1-i, Kam khwən1, Maonan khun1-i, Mulam khwən1-i < proto-Kam-Sui *khwən1 'road, way' | proto-Hlai *kuun1 || proto-Austronesian *Zalan (Thurgood 1994:353)

yuè jué shū 越絕書 (The Book of Yuè Records), 1st c. A.D.

絕 jué < dzjwet < *bdzot ← Siamese codD1 'to record, mark' (Zhengzhang Shangfang 1999:8)

"姑中山者越銅官之山也, 越人謂之銅, 「姑[沽]瀆」。"

“The Middle mountains of Gū are the mountains of the Yuè’s bronze office, the Yuè people call them ‘Bronze gū[gū]dú.”

「姑[沽]瀆」 gūdú < ku=duwk < *aka=alok

← Siamese kʰauA1 'horn', Daiya xau5, Sipsongpanna xau1, Dehong xau1, Lü xău1, Dioi kaou1 'mountain, hill' < proto-Tai *kʰauA2; Siamese luukD2l 'classifier for mountains', Siamese kʰauA1-luukD2l 'mountain' || cf. OC 谷 gǔ < kuwk << *ak-lok/luwk < *akə-lok/yowk < *blok 'valley'

"越人謂船爲「須盧」。"

"... The Yuè people call a boat xūlú. (‘beard’ & ‘cottage’)"

須 xū < sju < *bs(n)o

? ← Siamese saʔ 'noun prefix'

盧 lú < lu < *bra

← Siamese rɯaA2, Longzhou lɯɯ2, Bo'ai luu2, Daiya hə2, Dehong hə2 'boat' < proto-Tai *drɯ[a,o] | Sui lwa1/ʔda1, Kam lo1/lwa1, Be zoa < proto-Kam-Sui *s-lwa(n)A1 'boat'

"[劉]賈築吳市西城, 名曰「定錯」城。"

"[Líu] Jiă (the king of Jīng 荆) built the western wall, it was called dìngcuò ['settle(d)' & 'grindstone'] wall."

定 dìng < dengH < *adeng-s

← Siamese diaaŋA1, Daiya tʂhəŋ2, Sipsongpanna tseŋ2, Malay (Austronesian) dindiŋ2, Tagalog diŋdiŋ2 wall'

錯 cuò < tshak < *atshak

? ← Siamese tokD1s 'to set→sunset→west' (tawan-tok 'sun-set' = 'west'); Longzhou tuk7, Bo'ai tɔk7, Daiya tok7, Sipsongpanna tok7 < proto-Tai *tokD1s ǀ Sui tok7, Mak tok7, Maonan tɔk < proto-Kam-Sui *tɔkD1

Substrate in modern Chinese languages
Besides a limited number of lexical items left in Chinese historical texts, remnants of language(s) spoken by the ancient Yue can be found in non-Han substrata in Southern Chinese dialects, e.g.: Wu, Min, Hakka, Yue, etc. Robert Bauer (1987) identifies twenty seven lexical items in Yue, Hakka and Min varieties, which share Kra–Dai roots. The following are some examples cited from Bauer (1987):

to beat, whip: Yue-Guangzhou faak7a ← Wuming Zhuang fa:k8, Siamese faatD2L, Longzhou faat, Po-ai faat.
to beat, pound: Yue-Guangzhou tap8 ← Siamese thup4/top2, Longzhou tupD1, Po-ai tup3/tɔpD1, Mak/Dong tapD2, Tai Nuea top5, Sui-Lingam tjăpD2, Sui-Jungchiang tjăpD2, Sui-Pyo tjăpD2, T'en tjapD2, White Tai tup4, Red Tai tup3, Shan thup5, Lao Nong Khai thip3, Lue Moeng Yawng tup5, Leiping-Zhuang thop5/top4, Western Nung tup4, Yay tup5, Saek thap6, Tai Lo thup3, Tai Maw thup3, Tai No top5, Wuming Zhuang tup8, Li-Jiamao tap8.
to bite: Yue-Guangzhou khap8 ← Siamese khop2, Longzhou khoop5, Po-ai hap3, Ahom khup, Shan khop4, Lü khop, White Tai khop2, Nung khôp, Hsi-lin hapD2S, Wuming-Zhuang hap8, T'ien-pao hap, Black Tai khop2, Red Tai khop3, Lao Nong Khai khop1, Western Nung khap6, etc.
to burn: Yue-Guangzhou naat7a, Hakka nat8 ← Wuming Zhuang na:t8, Po-ai naatD1L "hot".
child: Min-Chaozhou noŋ1 kiā3 "child", Min-Suixi nuŋ3 kia3, Mandarin-Chengdu nɑŋ1 pɑ1 kər1 "youngest sibling", Min-Fuzhou nauŋ6 "young, immature" ← Siamese nɔɔŋ4, Tai Lo lɔŋ3, Tai Maw nɔŋ3, Tai No nɔŋ3 "younger sibing", Wuming Zhuang tak8 nu:ŋ4, Longzhou no:ŋ4 ba:u5, Buyi nuaŋ4, Dai-Xishuangbanna nɔŋ4 tsa:i2, Dai-Dehong lɔŋ4 tsa:i2, etc.
correct, precisely, just now: Yue-Guangzhou ŋaam1 "correct", ŋaam1 ŋaam1 "just now", Hakka-Meixian ŋam5 ŋam5 "precisely", Hakka-Youding ŋaŋ1 ŋaŋ1 "just right", Min-Suixi ŋam1 "fit", Min-Chaozhou ŋam1, Min-Hainan ŋam1 ŋam1 "good" ← Wuming Zhuang ŋa:m1 "proper" / ŋa:m3 "precisely, appropriate" / ŋa:m5 "exactly", Longzhou ŋa:m5 vəi6.
to cover (1): Yue-Guangzhou hom6/ham6 ← Siamese hom2, Longzhou hum5, Po-ai hɔmB1, Lao hom, Ahom hum, Shan hom2, Lü hum, White Tai hum2, Black Tai hoom2, Red Tai hom3, Nung hôm, Tay hôm, Tho hoom, T'ien-pao ham, Dioi hom, Hsi-lin hɔm, T'ien-chow hɔm, Lao Nong Khai hom3, Western Nung ham2, etc.
to cover (2): Yue-Guangzhou khap7, Yue-Yangjiang kap7a, Hakka-Meixian khɛp7, Min-Xiamen kaˀ7, Min-Quanzhou kaˀ7, Min-Zhangzhou kaˀ7 "to cover" ← Wuming-Zhuang kop8 "to cover", Li-Jiamao khɔp7, Li-Baocheng khɔp7, Li-Qiandui khop9, Li-Tongshi khop7 "to cover".
to lash, whip, thrash: Yue-Guangzhou fit7 ← Wuming Zhuang fit8, Li-Baoding fi:t7.
monkey: Yue-Guangzhou ma4 lau1 ← Wuming Zhuang ma4 lau2, Mulao mə6 lau2.
to slip off, fall off, lose: Yue-Guangzhou lat7, Hakka lut7, Hakka-Yongding lut7, Min-Dongshandao lut7, Min-Suixi lak8, Min-Chaozhou luk7 ← Siamese lutD1S, Longzhou luut, Po-ai loot, Wiming-Zhuang lo:t7.
to stamp foot, trample: Yue-Guangzhou tam6, Hakka tem5 ← Wuming Zhuang tam6, Po-ai tamB2, Lao tham, Lü tam, Nung tam.
stupid: Yue-Guangzhou ŋɔŋ6, Hakka-Meixian ŋɔŋ5, Hakka-Yongfing ŋɔŋ5, Min-Dongshandao goŋ6, Min-Suixi ŋɔŋ1, Min-Fuzhou ŋouŋ6 ← Be-Lingao ŋən2, Wuming Zhuang ŋu:ŋ6, Li-Baoding ŋaŋ2, Li-Zhongsha ŋaŋ2, Li-Xifan ŋaŋ2, Li-Yuanmen ŋaŋ4, Li-Qiaodui ŋaŋ4, Li-Tongshi ŋaŋ4, Li-Baocheng ŋa:ŋ2, Li-Jiamao ŋa:ŋ2.
to tear, pinch, peel, nip: Yue-Guangzhou mit7 "tear, break off, pinch, peel off with finger", Hakka met7 "pluck, pull out, peel" ← Be-Lingao mit5 "rip, tear", Longzhou bitD1S, Po-ai mit, Nung bêt, Tay bit "pick, pluck, nip off", Wuming Zhuang bit7 "tear off, twist, peel, pinch, squeeze, press", Li-Tongshi mi:t7, Li-Baoding mi:t7 "pinch, squeeze, press".

Substrate in Cantonese
Yue-Hashimoto describes the Yue Chinese languages spoken in Guangdong as having a Tai influence. Robert Bauer (1996) points out twenty nine possible cognates between Cantonese spoken in Guangzhou and Kra–Dai, of which seven cognates are confirmed to originate from Kra–Dai sources:

 Cantonese kɐj1 hɔ:ŋ2 ← Wuming Zhuang kai5 ha:ŋ6 "young chicken which has not laid eggs"
 Cantonese ja:ŋ5 ← Siamese jâ:ŋ "to step on, tread"
 Cantonese kɐm6 ← Wuming Zhuang kam6, Siamese kʰòm, Be-Lingao xɔm4 "to press down"
 Cantonese kɐp7b na:3 ← Wuming Zhuang kop7, Siamese kòp "frog"
 Cantonese khɐp8 ← Siamese kʰòp "to bite"
 Cantonese lɐm5 ← Siamese lóm, Maonan lam5 "to collapse, to topple, to fall down (building)"
 Cantonese tɐm5 ← Wuming Zhuang tam5, Siamese tàm "to hang down, be low"

Substrate in Wu Chinese
Li Hui (2001) finds 126 Kra-Dai cognates in Maqiao Wu dialect spoken in the suburbs of Shanghai out of more than a thousand lexical items surveyed. According to the author, these cognates are likely traces of the Old Yue language. The two tables below show lexical comparisons between Maqiao Wu dialect and Kra-Dai languages quoted from Li Hui (2001). He notes that, in Wu dialect, final consonants such as -m, -ɯ, -i, ụ, etc don't exist, and therefore, -m in Maqiao dialect tends to become -ŋ or -n, or it's simply absent, and in some cases -m even becomes final glottal stop.

Austroasiatic arguments
Jerry Norman and Mei Tsu-Lin presented evidence that at least some Yue spoke an Austroasiatic language:
 A well-known loanword into Sino-Tibetan is k-la for tiger (Hanzi: 虎; Old Chinese (ZS): *qʰlaːʔ > Mandarin pinyin: hǔ, Sino-Vietnamese hổ) from Proto-Austroasiatic *kalaʔ (compare Vietic *k-haːlʔ > kʰaːlʔ > Vietnamese khái and Muong khảl).
 The early Chinese name for the Yangtze (EMC: kœ:ŋ; OC: *kroŋ; Cantonese: "kong") was later extended to a general word for "river" in south China. Norman and Mei suggest that the word is cognate with Vietnamese sông (from *krong) and Mon kruŋ "river".

They also provide evidence of an Austroasiatic substrate in the vocabulary of Min Chinese. For example:
 *-dəŋA "shaman" may be compared with Vietnamese đồng (/ɗoŋ2/) "to shamanize, to communicate with spirits" and Mon doŋ "to dance (as if) under demonic possession".
 *kiɑnB 囝 "son" appears to be related to Vietnamese con (/kɔn/) and Mon kon "child".

Norman and Mei's hypothesis has been criticized by Laurent Sagart, who demonstrates that many of the supposed loan words can be better explained as archaic Chinese words, or even loans from Austronesian languages; he also argues that the Vietic cradle must be located farther south in current north Vietnam.
Norman & Mei also compares Min verb "to know, to recognize"  (Proto-Min *pat; whence Fuzhou  & Amoy ) to Vietnamese biết, also meaning "to know, to recognize". However, Sagart contends that the Min & Vietnamese sense "to know, to recognize" is semantically extended from well-attested Chinese verb  "to distinguish, discriminate, differentiate" ((Mandarin: bié;; OC: *bred); thus Sagart considers Vietnamese biết as a loanword from Chinese.
According to the Shuowen Jiezi (100 AD), "In Nanyue, the word for dog is (EMC: nuw-ʂuw)", possibly related to other Austroasiatic terms. Sōu is "hunt" in modern Chinese. However, in Shuowen Jiezi, the word for dog is also recorded as 獶獀 with its most probable pronunciation around 100 CE must have been *ou-sou, which resembles proto-Austronesian *asu, *u‑asu 'dog' than it resembles the palatal‑initialed Austroasiatic monosyllable Vietnamese chó, Old Mon clüw, etc.
 Zheng Xuan (127–200 AD) wrote that  (Middle Chinese: , modern Mandarin Chinese zā, modern Sino-Vietnamese: "trát") was the word used by the Yue people (越人) to mean "die". Norman and Mei reconstruct this word as OC *tsət and relate it to Austroasiatic words with the same meaning, such as Vietnamese chết and Mon chɒt. However, Laurent Sagart points out that  is a well‑attested Chinese word also meaning "to die", which is overlooked by Norman and Mei. That this word occurred in the Old Yue language in Han times could be because the Old Yue language borrowed it from Chinese. Therefore, the resemblance of this Chinese word to an Austroasiatic word is probably accidental.
 According to Sagart, the resemblance between the Min word *-dəŋA "shaman" or "spirit healer" and the Vietnamese term đồng is undoubtedly by chance.

Moreover, Chamberlain (1998) posits that the Austroasiatic predecessor of the modern Vietnamese language originated in modern-day Bolikhamsai Province and Khammouane Province in Laos as well as parts of Nghệ An Province and Quảng Bình Province in Vietnam, rather than in the region north of the Red River delta. However, Ferlus (2009) showed that the inventions of pestle, oar and a pan to cook sticky rice, which is the main characteristic of the Đông Sơn culture, correspond to the creation of new lexicons for these inventions in Northern Vietic (Việt–Mường) and Central Vietic (Cuoi-Toum). The new vocabularies of these inventions were proven to be derivatives from original verbs rather than borrowed lexical items. The current distribution of Northern Vietic also correspond to the area of Đông Sơn culture. Thus, Ferlus concludes that the Northern Vietic (Viet-Muong) speakers are the "most direct heirs" of the Dongsonians, who have resided in Southern part of Red river delta and North Central Vietnam since the 1st millennium BC. In addition, archaeogenetics demonstrated that before the Dong Son period, the Red River Delta's inhabitants were predominantly Austroasiatic: genetic data from Phùng Nguyên culture's burial site (dated to 1,800 BCE) at Mán Bạc (in present-day Ninh Bình Province, Vietnam)have close proximity to modern Austroasiatic speakers, while "mixed genetics" from Đông Sơn culture's Núi Nấp site showed affinity to "Dai from China, Tai-Kadai speakers from Thailand, and Austroasiatic speakers from Vietnam, including the Kinh"; these results indicated that significant contact happened between Tai speakers and Vietic speakers.

Ye (2014) identified a few Austroasiatic loanwords in Ancient Chu dialect of Old Chinese.

Writing system
There is no known evidence of a writing system among the Yue peoples of the Lingnan region in pre-Qin times, and the Chinese conquest of the region is believed to have introduced writing to the area. However, Liang Tingwang, a professor from the Central University of Nationalities, said that the ancient Zhuang had their own proto-writing system but had to give it up because of the Qinshi Emperor's tough policy and to adopt the Han Chinese writing system, which ultimately developed into the old Zhuang demotic script alongside the classical Chinese writing system, during the Tang dynasty (618–907).

Notes

References

Sources

 
 
 
 
 
 
 
 
 
 
 

Further reading

Zhengzhang Shangfang 1999. "An Interpretation of the Old Yue Language Written in Goujiàn's Wéijiă lìng" [句践"维甲"令中之古越语的解读]. In Minzu Yuwen 4, pp. 1–14.
Zhengzhang Shangfang 1998. "Gu Yueyu" 古越語 [The old Yue language]. In Dong Chuping 董楚平 et al. Wu Yue wenhua zhi 吳越文化誌 [Record of the cultures of Wu and Yue]. Shanghai: Shanghai renmin chubanshe, 1998, vol. 1, pp. 253–281.
Zhengzhang Shangfang 1990. "Some Kam-Tai Words in Place Names of the Ancient Wu and Yue States" [古吴越地名中的侗台语成份]. In Minzu Yuwen'' 6.

Unclassified languages of Asia
Extinct languages of Asia
Yue (state)
Baiyue